Paisley District Tramways Company operated a tramway service in Paisley between 1903 and 1923.

History

Paisley District Tramways Company took over the Paisley Tramways Company on 17 September 1903 and undertook a programme of modernisation and electrification. The first electric tramway services started on 13 June 1904.

There were depots at: 
Aurs Road, Barrhead
Main Road, Elderslie
Paisley Road, Renfrew

Takeover

The company was taken over by Glasgow Corporation Tramways on 1 August 1923, which continued to operate trams in Paisley until the late 1950s.

Paisley District Tramways Company tramcar 68 survived and is preserved in the National Tramway Museum, Paisley 17 (Glasgow 1017) survived and runs at Summerlee, Museum of Scottish Industrial Life.

References

Tram transport in Scotland
4 ft 7¾ in gauge railways in Scotland